Ruben Oseguera may refer to:

 Rubén Oseguera Cervantes (b. 1966), alleged leader of the Jalisco New Generation Cartel (CJNG).
 Rubén Oseguera González (b. 1990), alleged second-in-command in the CJNG; imprisoned.